Wilson Pires de Carvalho,  Liliu (born 16 April 1979), is a Brazilian-born Belgian futsal player who plays for Châtelineau and the Belgian national futsal team.

References

External links
UEFA profile
Futsalteam profile

1979 births
Living people
Belgian men's futsal players
Belgian people of Brazilian descent